Atal Bihari Vajpayee was sworn in as Prime Minister of India for third time on 13 October 1999. He headed his Third Vajpayee Ministry. Here is the list of ministers in his ministry.

Cabinet ministers 

|}

Ministers of state 

|}

Demographics of the Council of Ministers

Reshuffles 
In a reshuffle on 29 September 2000, Venkaiah Naidu and Sushma Swaraj were inducted in the ministry as cabinet ministers and Shripad Yasso Naik (Goa), Satyabrata Mukherjee (West Bengal), Kanyakumari MP P.Radhakrishnan and film star-turned-MP U V Krishnam Raju (Andhra Pradesh) as minister of state. Later that year Uma Bharti was elevated to cabinet rank.

In a reshuffle in 2001 Vajpayee inducted Karia Munda, Ved Prakash Goyal, Syed Shahnawaz Hussain and Tapan Sikdar as Cabinet ministers and Anna Sahib Patil, Ashok Pradhan, Ravi Shankar Prasad and Rajiv Pratap Rudy as ministers of state.

In a reshuffle in 2002 he dropped four ministers and inducted four new cabinet ministers and nine new ministers of state. New cabinet ministers were:  Shatrughan Sinha, Sahib Singh Verma, Jana Krishnamurthy, Balasaheb Vikhe Patil. The new ministers of state were: Basangouda Patil, Sanjay Paswan, Shripad Yasso Naik, Vinod Khanna, Nikhil Chaudhary, S.Thirunavukarasar, Anant Geete and A. K. Moorthy .

In a reshuffle in 2003 Vajpayee inducted three new cabinet rank ministers and five ministers of state . The new cabinet ministers were :Rajnath Singh, B.C. Khanduri and Subodh Mohite. The new ministers of state were : Chinmayanand Swami (BJP), Kailash Meghwal (BJP), Nagmani (Rashtriya Janata Dal-Democratic), Prahlad Singh Patel (BJP) and P.C. Thomas (Indian Federal Democratic Party).

References

External links 

Indian union ministries
Vajpayee administration
1999 establishments in India
2004 disestablishments in India
Cabinets established in 1999
Cabinets disestablished in 2004
Atal Bihari Vajpayee
Bharatiya Janata Party
Samata Party
Shiromani Akali Dal
Dravida Munnetra Kazhagam
Pattali Makkal Katchi
Biju Janata Dal
Shiv Sena
Janata Dal (United)
Marumalarchi Dravida Munnetra Kazhagam
Jammu & Kashmir National Conference
Trinamool Congress
Rashtriya Lok Dal